There have been a number of manifestos related to film.  These propose the author/s feelings and briefing on the how and why of film:

Notes

See also

Postmodernist film
Vulgar auteurism
Film theory

Manifestos
Manifestos